The Augstmatthorn is a mountain of the Emmental Alps, overlooking Lake Brienz in the Bernese Oberland. The largely forested land from the top of the mountain southwards to the lake has been identified by BirdLife International as a 15,900 ha Important Bird Area. Augstmatthorn and its neighbouring peak Suggiture (2085 m) are both within a Federal Wildlife Protection Area as well as a protected moorland area. In these areas camping and drone flying are prohibited by law.

References

External links

 Augstmatthorn on Hikr
 Augstmatthorn Wildlife Protection Area
 Augstmatthorn Drone No-Fly Zone Map
 Augstmatthorn Hiking Area rules

Mountains of the Alps
Emmental Alps
Mountains of Switzerland
Mountains of the canton of Bern
Important Bird Areas of Switzerland
Two-thousanders of Switzerland